Nightwolf is a fictional character in the Mortal Kombat fighting game franchise by Midway Games/NetherRealm Studios. He debuted in Mortal Kombat 3 (1995) as a Native American shaman selected to help defend Earthrealm against invading forces from Outworld. In addition to his fighting prowess, Nightwolf possesses magical abilities that allow him to enhance his strength and create weapons.

The character has appeared in various media outside of the games, including as one of the central heroes in the animated series Mortal Kombat: Defenders of the Realm (1996). His portrayal in the franchise has been criticized as a stereotype of Native Americans, although his depiction in the rebooted games has received a more positive reception.

Appearances

Mortal Kombat games
In Mortal Kombat 3 although he is introduced as a historian and shaman, Nightwolf does not live in the past. He is a proud and fierce warrior dedicated to the cause of good and is in contact with Raiden through visions. As such, he draws both on internal and external spiritual energy to enhance his strength. Although his patch of tribal land provided a vital protective area for the Earthrealm warriors during Shao Kahn's invasion, Nightwolf prefers solitary work to companionship. He had been warned of the coming invasion by a vision from Raiden. As such, he was fully aware and prepared for the events as they occurred, including attacks by the Kahn's extermination squads. As his homeland was protected by shamanic magic, Nightwolf would soon be joined by the other chosen warriors. Together, they traveled back to the East Coast, prepared for battle against the Emperor and his minions, and won.

Nightwolf returned during the events of Mortal Kombat: Deception. In the events leading to the game, Nightwolf suffered recurring nightmares of Onaga the Dragon King's resurrection. He recognized these as a warning, but despite knowing a new threat was coming, he was unable to stop his nightmares from coming true when Reptile transformed into Onaga. Fortunately, he was prepared as his forefathers handed down the means with which he could defeat the Dragon King, the "Sin Eater'; which involved absorbing the sins of his tribe. Fearing the possibility of hurting his friends after he became the Sin Eater, Nightwolf chose to face Onaga alone. He traveled to the Netherrealm, drew Onaga's soul to him, and released his ancestors' absorbed sins to remove the Dragon King from Reptile and bind the former to the Netherrealm.

In Mortal Kombat: Armageddon, having completed his quest, Nightwolf was guided back to Earthrealm by his spirit guides. Along the way, he received visions of a battle where an unknown power was forcing the participating warriors to fight each other. His visions slowly became reality when he agreed to help Johnny Cage and his allies combat the fallen Elder God Shinnok and his forces. While preparing for the battle, Nightwolf was met by Kitana and the spirit of Liu Kang, who was bound to Earth through his bond with her. Despite being weakened by his fight with Onaga, Nightwolf used his remaining magic to relieve Kitana of her burden and took custody of Liu Kang's spirit. In his arcade ending, Nightwolf defeats Blaze and absorbs his power. As a result, he is sent to the spirit world and becomes the ultimate shaman. He finds Liu Kang's spirit and guides it back to the physical world, making him human once more.

In the 2011 reboot, Nightwolf is seen as a participant in the first Mortal Kombat tournament. When Shang Tsung selects him as Scorpion's next opponent, Nightwolf berates Scorpion for his quest for vengeance though the latter accuses the former of dishonoring his people by not seeking vengeance for the injustices they have suffered. Nightwolf proceeds to fight Scorpion, but is defeated and eliminated from the tournament. He is later seen among the Earthrealm warriors who congratulate Liu Kang for winning the tournament, though he is not present during the victory ceremony nor the second tournament. He reappears during Outworld's invasion to recruit Stryker. During the battle, Nightwolf destroys Shao Kahn's Soulnado and survived Sindel's initial onslaught. Ultimately however, Nightwolf sacrifices himself to destroy Sindel during her second assault, allowing the sorcerer Quan Chi to claim his soul and turn him into a revenant underling. 

While Nightwolf's revenant is present during the events of Mortal Kombat X, he is a non-playable character with no lines and a negligible role in the story.

Nightwolf returns in Mortal Kombat 11, with his human self from the 2011 reboot as his default appearance while his Revenant form appears as an alternate gear appearance. In his arcade ending, a young Nightwolf -- then known as Grey Cloud -- initially resented his people for selling out to the colonizers and fell in with Kano's Black Dragon crime cartel as a result. However, when Kano asked him to help steal the Matoka's sacred treasures, he refused. Kano mortally wounded him in retaliation, but the Great Spirit saved him and granted Grey Cloud the mantle of Nightwolf. In the DLC story expansion, Aftermath, a past version of Nightwolf joined forces with Shang Tsung and Fujin to retrieve Kronika's Crown of Souls and help Liu Kang restore history. While battling his revenant counterpart during a mission to capture Sindel's revenant and revive her, Shang Tsung drained revenant Nightwolf's soul in retaliation for wounding him. Despite securing the Crown and taking part in assaulting Kronika's keep, Nightwolf and his allies were betrayed by Shang Tsung and Sindel.

Character design
Nightwolf was originally developed during a create-a-character contest, follow the release of Mortal Kombat II. During early development of Mortal Kombat 3, the character was known simply as "Indian" before his name was determined. Ed Boon described him to VideoGames magazine in April 1995 (issue #75) as "a very nontraditional Indian. He doesn't swing an axe that he's always holding, like Chief Thunder from Killer Instinct. He doesn't have all of the stereotypical Indian-type things like T. Hawk or Chief Thunder; he doesn't go 'Hoya! Hoya!' and all that." Nightwolf uses a mystical set of weapons (a tomahawk and a bow and arrow) in battle.

Nightwolf was portrayed by Midway Games artist Sal DiVita in Mortal Kombat 3, who also played Cyrax, Sektor, and Smoke. DiVita said about his casting: "I was just walking around and John [Tobias] said, 'Hey, man, you've got some arms; hey, got a big chest. You want to be a character?' I'm like, 'Sure!' And that's how it happened."

Gameplay
According to guides by both Mean Machines Sega and SuperGamePower, the best part about him in the original MK3 was his then-unique ability to deflect any projectile back towards an opponent. Total 64 opined that, once mastered, Nightwolf "is one of the brightest stars" of Mortal Kombat Trilogy, as "none of his moves are seemingly useful at the start, but stick[ing] with him [might] get some great results."

Prima Games' official guide for Armageddon gave Nightwolf a poor overall rating of 4/10, stating that the character, "while being a solid punisher character, has a difficult time inflicting heavy damage on opponents." In Prima Games' official guide for the 2011 Mortal Kombat reboot, Nightwolf was judged to be a much-improved character due to his "shoulder and power charge moves [used] to knock down" opponents and his uppercut being "an excellent move to counter jumpers."

Other media

Nightwolf is a main character in the 1996 cartoon series Mortal Kombat: Defenders of the Realm, voiced by Tod Thawley. He serves to offer spiritual and technical help to the Earthrealm warriors and is depicted as having expertise in computer technology. He has a pet wolf named Kiva who could merge with Nightwolf to increase his power.

Nightwolf briefly appeared in the 1997 film Mortal Kombat: Annihilation, and was played by Native American rapper and actor Litefoot.

Nightwolf breifly appeared in a flashback as one of the film's version of a Revenant in the 2022 film Mortal Kombat Legends: Snow Blind.

Nightwolf has not been featured in other MK alternate media, but stunt coordinator Larnell Stovall stated in a 2011 interview with ShogunGamer that he had wanted the character added for the 2013 second season of the Mortal Kombat: Legacy web series, describing him as "too cool due to his powers, knives and that axe!"

Merchandise and promotion
An action figure of Nightwolf was released by Jazwares in July 2012. It came in two versions, 4-inch and 6-inch.

Reception

Ethnic representation
Nightwolf has often been unfavorably discussed in the context of the portrayal of Native Americans in video games. Boon's 1995 description of the character to VideoGames provoked a comment from the magazine: "For a character described by Midway as a 'nontraditional Indian,' he certainly has all the trappings of one. Let's see, he wears feathers and war paint, swings a hatchet, shoots arrows...could there be a 'Scalp' Fatality?" Complex, in 2012, deemed Nightwolf the top stereotypical character in all video games, describing him as "the epitome of every red-skinned, feather-wearing sports mascot and old cowboy movie serial ... [he] has warpaint on his face, a feather in his hair and the sleeveless vest as if Geronimo himself just gave it up." David Wong of Cracked included Nightwolf as an example of an ethnically-stereotypical game character in a 2012 feature about racial prejudices in video game design.

Hardcore Gaming 101 said of the character's role in the Mortal Kombat series, "In the mid-'90s, it was practically an unwritten law that every fighting game had to have either a Bruce Lee clone, [or] a Native American ... Nightwolf takes up the latter slot." This belief was concurred by Gavin Jasper of Den of Geek: "He seemed to be there [in MK3] because throwing a Native American into your fighting game series was the in-thing to do back in the '90s." In a 2008 feature on Native American stereotyping in video games, GamesRadar exemplified Nightwolf for the "Warrior" trope. "[W]hile this pro-Indian sentiment is certainly heartwarming, much of Nightwolf’s character is wide of the mark." The site added that the act of "sin-eating" (his role in Deception) was actually European in origin, and criticized his Animality in MK3 as being "for gratuitous shock value." Topless Robot said, "Nightwolf’s design and backstory are standard-issue for Native American characters in fighting games ... [but] his look is actually less stereotypical than, say, Chief Thunder’s from Killer Instinct."

Other reception
The character's presence in the 2011 reboot was better received. UGO ranked him 20th in their 2012 list of the top fifty series characters. "Nightwolf uses the magic of the shaman to ward off evil-doers and to bring peace to the realms...by kicking everyone's ass." Fans voted him the series' 28th-best character in a 2013 online poll hosted by Dorkly. Den of Geek placed Nightwolf 51st in their 2015 ranking of the MK franchise's 73 playable characters, calling him "the most ho-hum member of the Mortal Kombat 3 cast," yet lauding him for killing Sindel in the MK2011 story mode "when she went all John Cena" on the Earthrealm defenders. Complex ranked him among the MK series' most underrated characters, stating that "the fact that he can transform into a wolf and maul you to death should tell you he's nothing to play with." In 2012, Game Informer unfavorably compared the "uninspiring" then-new Soulcalibur V character Z.W.E.I. to Nightwolf in that, he "summons a spirit wolf, and his move set is more annoying than practical." His "Ascension" Fatality from MK2011 was ranked ninth in Paste's selection of the reboot's top nine Fatalities. 

Nightwolf's DLC appearance in Mortal Kombat 11 has been reviewed by Mitchell Saltzman of IGN, who praised his "versatile playstyle" and his outro animation, opining "Netherrealm did a great job of making Nightwolf’s moveset feel unique and fun, despite the fact that many of his signature moves are actually kind of plain." Saltzman also felt his gear and skins were "respectfully done and avoid the pitfall of stereotypes." He was also reviewed by Patricio Kobek at TheGamer, who described him as being made with "care and attention paid to his previous iterations and looks to be a dominant force in the meta."

As was the case with most of the cast of characters in Mortal Kombat: Annihilation, Nightwolf's appearance was critically panned. Newsarama dismissed him as "useless," and Maitland McDonagh of TV Guide called the character "dopey." Eric Snider of Film.com said of his opening dialogue exchange with Liu Kang, "I couldn’t hear the rest because my brain was exploding." 411Mania called his tutelage of Liu Kang "hippie Native American Yoda spiel." Kate Willaert of Game Informer sardonically remarked, "Nightwolf delivers the best line in the movie when he tells Liu Kang he must test his courage, and find his Animality. ... As a result, the film's final climactic battle turns into Primal Rage: The Movie." Io9's Alasdair Wilkins said of the character's depiction in the film, in particular the scene of Nightwolf knocking out Liu Kang with the hatchet, "Nightwolf isn't just a magical shapeshifting shaman who only exists to show the hero his destiny...he's also kind of an asshole." However, Doug Skiles of KillerMovies said in his 1997 review, "The only person putting forth anything resembling effort is Litefoot, who plays Nightwolf, at least for the whopping two minutes that he's on the screen."

References

Fictional Apache people
Fictional Native American people in video games
Fictional Vale Tudo practitioners
Fictional archers
Fictional axefighters
Fictional historians
Fictional knife-fighters
Fictional shamans
Fictional martial artists in video games
Fictional taekwondo practitioners
Ghost characters in video games
Male characters in video games
Mortal Kombat characters
Religious worker characters in video games
Shapeshifter characters in video games
Video game characters introduced in 1995
Video game characters with electric or magnetic abilities
Video game protagonists
Zombie and revenant characters in video games